Pleasant Township, Ohio may refer to:

Pleasant Township, Brown County, Ohio
Pleasant Township, Clark County, Ohio
Pleasant Township, Fairfield County, Ohio
Pleasant Township, Franklin County, Ohio
Pleasant Township, Hancock County, Ohio
Pleasant Township, Hardin County, Ohio
Pleasant Township, Henry County, Ohio
Pleasant Township, Knox County, Ohio
Pleasant Township, Logan County, Ohio
Pleasant Township, Madison County, Ohio
Pleasant Township, Marion County, Ohio
Pleasant Township, Perry County, Ohio
Pleasant Township, Putnam County, Ohio
Pleasant Township, Seneca County, Ohio
Pleasant Township, Van Wert County, Ohio

See also
Pleasant Township (disambiguation)

Ohio township disambiguation pages